Pachperwa is a town and a nagar panchayat in Balrampur district in the Indian state of Uttar Pradesh. The National Highway 730 connected the town to district headquarters as well as other cities.

Politics 
The Pachperwa city is divided into 12 wards for which elections are held every 5 years.

Demographics 
As of 2011 Indian Census, Pachperwa Nagar Panchayat had a total population of 17,220, of which 8,915 were males and 8,305 were females. The Female Sex Ratio was of 932. Population within the age group of 0 to 6 years was 2,646. The total number of literates in Pachperwa was 7,510, which constituted 43.6% of the population with male literacy of 48.8% and female literacy of 38.1%. The effective literacy rate of 7+ population of Pachperwa was 51.5%, of which male literacy rate was 57.8% and female literacy rate was 44.9%. The Scheduled Castes and Scheduled Tribes population was 604 and 46 respectively. Pachperwa had 2573 households in 2011.

See also 
 Bargadwa Saif
 Basantpur
 Ganeshpur

Transportation

Railways
Pachperwa is connected to Gorakhpur though rail. Gorakhpur-Badshahnagar Express halts at Pachperwa railway station.

References

Cities and towns in Balrampur district, Uttar Pradesh